The Fort Mercer Flag is a variant of the American flag flown at Fort Mercer around 1777 during the American Revolution. This unique flag had inverted colors similar to that of the Serapis flag. Some replicas of the flag usually contain inverted stars and a wider ratio.

See also
 History of the flags of the United States
 Flags of the United States Armed Forces

References

Flags of the American Revolution
Flags introduced in 1777
Military flags of the United States